eGames can refer to

 eGames (esports), an international eSports competition 
 eGames (video game developer), based in Langhorne, Pennsylvania, US